Julia Coleman, of the U.S. state of New York, was Superintendent of the Literature (publications) Department of the Women's Christian Temperance Union (WCTU).  In 1868 she presented a lecture on "Alcohol our Enemy" at her church and quickly became involved in anti-alcohol activities. She wrote temperance articles for the National Temperance Publishing House and the Youth's Temperance Visitor. She then became convinced that temperance should be taught in the schools, a belief shared by Mary Hunt, with whom she worked closely. In doing so she contributed significantly to Scientific Temperance Instruction and was an important part of the temperance movement.

References

Sources
 Willard, Frances E. Women and Temperance. Hartford, CT: Park Publishing, 1883.

Year of birth missing
Year of death missing
Woman's Christian Temperance Union people
Educators from New York (state)
19th-century American educators
19th-century American women educators